Kotihome Dham is a religious site in Eastern Development Region, Nepal. It is located in the Kankai Municipality of Jhapa District. Other names it famously goes by are Kankai Mai and Kankai Dham.

History
Since a long time ago people have come to worship in the Kankai River. They believe that doing so will fulfill their wishes. In the same way, in Poush of 2042 B.S. a great worship was done whole month in the leadership of yogi Narharinath. After that, this place developed into one of the religious sites of Nepal.

References

Religious buildings and structures in Nepal
Jhapa District